Theodora Dimova (Bulgarian: Теодора Димова) (born 19 September 1960 in Sofia, Bulgaria) is a Bulgarian writer and playwright. She graduated in English Language Studies from the Sofia University "St. Kliment Ohridski" and has studied at the Royal Court Theatre in London. She has won many literary awards. Theodora Dimova is daughter of the famous Bulgarian writer Dimitar Dimov.

Books 

Novels
 Emine (2001)
 Maikite (2005)
 Adriana (2007)
 Marma, Mariam (2010)

Plays
 Fyuri
 Staya № 48
 Erikapayos
 Calvados, priyatelyu
 Igrila
 Platoto
 Neda i Kuchetata
 Elin
 Stoper
 Zamakat Ireloh
 Bez Kozha
 Zmiysko Mlyako
 Kuchkata
 Lyubovnitsi

External links
 Theodora Dimova's Profile at the Contemporary Bulgarian Writers Website
 Theodora Dimova at www.slovo.bg
 Dimitar Kambourov about Marma, Mariam (2010)

1960 births
Bulgarian writers
Living people
Bulgarian women writers